The Joint Declaration by Members of the United Nations was the first formal statement to the world about the Holocaust, issued  on December 17, 1942, by the American and British governments on behalf of the Allied Powers. In it, they describe the ongoing events of the Holocaust in Nazi-occupied Europe.

The statement was read to British House of Commons in a floor speech by Foreign secretary Anthony Eden, and published on the front page of the New York Times and many other newspapers. It was made in response to a 16-page note addressed to the Allied governments on December 10 by the Minister of Foreign Affairs of the Polish government-in-exile, Count Edward Raczynski, titled The Mass Extermination of Jews in German Occupied Poland and his official Raczyński's Note addressed to western governments.

The Members then stood in silence, an honour usually reserved for the death of a Monarch.

Text

See also 

 Punishment for War Crimes

References

1942 documents
International response to the Holocaust